Sandro Munari (born 27 March 1940), also nicknamed 'Il Drago' (The Dragon) is a former motor racing and rally driver from Italy.

Career
Sandro Munari was born in Cavarzere, in the Veneto region. He began rallying in 1965 and won the Italian Rally Championship in 1967 and 1969, adding the European Rally Championship title in 1973. In 1972 he won the Targa Florio sports car endurance race, partnering Arturo Merzario in a works Ferrari 312PB. Also in 1972 Munari claimed his first major rally victory, winning the Monte Carlo Rally in a works Lancia Fulvia.

Munari was to become strongly associated with another of Lancia's rally icons – the Lancia Stratos HF. The partnership between the Italian car and the driver scooped a further Monte Carlo Rally hat-trick in the mid-1970s, among a total of seven World Rally Championship victories. Munari also won the 1977 FIA Cup for Rally Drivers title. Later in his career he competed with a Fiat 131 Abarth, finishing third at the 1978 Tour de Corse and sixth at the 1980 Rallye Côte d'Ivoire. His last WRC appearances were at the Safari Rally, which he contested from 1981 to 1984, but retired each time.

Bibliography
Sandro Munari and Cesare De Agostini, La coda del Drago, Edizioni Rombo, Bologna, 1981
Sandro Munari and Sergio Remondino, Sandro Munari: Una vita di traverso, Giorgio Nada Editore, Milan, 2007

Complete IMC results

Complete WRC results

WRC victories
{|class="wikitable"
!   #  
! Event
! Season
! Co-driver
! Car
|-
| 1
|  16º Rallye Sanremo
| 
| Mario Mannucci
| Lancia Stratos HF
|-
| 2
|  3rd Rally Rideau Lakes
| 
| Mario Mannucci
| Lancia Stratos HF
|-
| 3
|  43ème Rallye Automobile de Monte-Carlo
| 
| Mario Mannucci
| Lancia Stratos HF
|-
| 4
|  44ème Rallye Automobile de Monte-Carlo
| 
| Silvio Maiga
| Lancia Stratos HF
|-
| 5
|  10º Rallye de Portugal Vinho do Porto
| 
| Silvio Maiga
| Lancia Stratos HF
|-
| 6
|  20ème Tour de Corse
| 
| Silvio Maiga
| Lancia Stratos HF
|-
| 7
|  45ème Rallye Automobile de Monte-Carlo
| 
| Silvio Maiga
| Lancia Stratos HF
|}

References

1940 births
Living people
Lancia people
Sportspeople from the Metropolitan City of Venice
Italian rally drivers
World Rally Champions
World Rally Championship drivers
World Sportscar Championship drivers
European Rally Championship drivers